Morning Star is an American daytime soap opera which aired on NBC from September 27, 1965 to July 1, 1966. The show was created by Ted Corday who would later create the daytime serial Days of Our Lives.

The show aired at 11:00 AM; it was paired with Paradise Bay which aired after it and also was created by Ted Corday.  Morning Star and Paradise Bay were also cancelled on the same day. Morning Star was one of the first soap operas to air in color.

Overview
The show followed Katy Elliot who was a fashion designer from Connecticut; she moved to New York City to begin work in her chosen field. It followed her trials and tribulations along with those of her roommates Joan Mitchell and Joan's daughter Liz. Katy had left her hometown of Springdale after the death of Greg Ross, her fiance, who had been killed in a traffic accident before they were to have been married. In New York, Katy met and fell in love with Bill Riley, She also had contact with her aunt Millie Elliot; her uncle, Ed Elliot, who was a judge in Springdale; and her sixteen-year-old sister, Jan.

As did Days of our Lives, the show opened with an epigraph, as was customary for soap operas of the time, "No matter how dark the night, there is always a new dawn to come. The sun is but a morning star."

Ratings

 
1965-1966 Season
1. As the World Turns 13.9
2. The Guiding Light 11.2
3. Search for Tomorrow 11.0
4. The Secret Storm 10.9
13.  4.1 (Debut)

References

External links 
 

1965 American television series debuts
1966 American television series endings
American television soap operas
Black-and-white American television shows
English-language television shows
NBC original programming
Television series by Sony Pictures Television